Sung-chul, also spelled Seong-cheol or Song-chol, is a Korean masculine given name. The meaning differs based on the hanja used to write each syllable of the name. There are 27 hanja with the reading "sung" and 11 hanja with the reading "chul" on the South Korean government's official list of hanja which may be registered for use in given names.

People with this name include:

Politicians
Pak Song-chol (1913–2008), North Korean politician, premier from 1976 to 1977
Yang Sung-chul (born 1939), South Korean political scientist, politician, and diplomat
Kim Song-chol (politician), North Korean politician and general

Sportspeople
Han Seong-cheol (born 1948), South Korean judo practitioner
Nam Song-chol (born 1982), North Korean international footballer
Kim Song-chol (footballer) (born 1983), North Korean footballer (DPR Korea Premier Football League, China League One)
Pak Song-chol (athlete) (born 1984), North Korean long-distance runner
Ri Song-chol (born 1986), North Korean figure skater
Pak Song-chol (footballer, born 1987), North Korean international footballer (DPR Korea Premier Football League, Cambodian Premier League)
Son Seong-cheol (born 1987), South Korean springboard diver
Pak Song-chol (footballer, born 1991), North Korean footballer (DPR Korea Premier Football League)
Kim Song-chol (born 1993), North Korean weightlifter

Others
Seongcheol, dharma name of Yi Yeongju (1912–1993), South Korean Seon Buddhist master
Shin Sung-chul (born 1952), South Korean physicist
Kim Sung-cheol (born 1991), South Korean actor

See also
List of Korean given names
Myong Song-chol (born 1982), North Korean footballer 
Yu Song-chol, North Korean footballer

References

Korean masculine given names